The Finland national badminton team represents Finland in international badminton team competitions. It is controlled by Badminton Finland (Finnish: Suomen Sulkapallo), the national organization for badminton in Finland.

The Finnish men's team have once participated the Thomas Cup in 1994 but were eliminated in the group stage. The team's most recent achievement was achieving a semifinalist bronze position at the 2014 European Men's Team Badminton Championships. The women's team have never competed in the Uber Cup. Their best result was reaching the quarterfinals at the 2016 European Women's Team Badminton Championships.

The mixed team participated in the Sudirman Cup simultaneously until 2007. The team later qualified for the Sudirman Cup again in 2021 when Vantaa was chosen as the host for the 2021 Sudirman Cup. Finland finished in 14th place after being eliminated in the group stage.

Participation in BWF competitions

Thomas Cup

Sudirman Cup 

**Red border color indicates tournament was held on home soil.

Participation in European Team Badminton Championships
Finland finished up as semifinalists in the 2014 European Men's and Women's Team Badminton Championships. The team got through the quarterfinal by beating Sweden with a score of 3-0. The first three singles, Ville Lång, Eetu Heino and Anton Kaisti beat Sweden's Henri Hurskainen, Gabriel Ulldahl and Mattias Borg to win the tie.

Men's Team

Women's Team

Mixed Team

**Red border color indicates tournament was held on home soil.

Participation in European Junior Team Badminton Championships
Mixed Team

Current squad 
The following players were selected to represent Finland at the 2021 Sudirman Cup.

Male players
Kalle Koljonen
Eetu Heino
Iikka Heino
Anton Kaisti
Joonas Korhonen
Miika Lahtinen
Tony Lindelöf
Joakim Oldorff
Jere Övermark
Jesper Paul

Female players
Hanna Karkaus
Nella Nyqvist
Mathilda Lindholm
Jenny Nyström
Heidi Puro
Nella Siilasmaa
Iina Suutarinen

References

Badminton
National badminton teams
Badminton in Finland